The Tom Thumb House is a historic house in Middleborough, Massachusetts.  The 2 story wood-frame house was built in the 1870s as a summer home for the dwarf entertainer Charles Stratton, best known by his stage name, General Tom Thumb.  It has Second Empire architecture, including a mansard roof, paired brackets in the cornice, and paired columns supporting the porch.  The interior was built to meet the needs of the  Stratton and his wife Lavinia, who was also a proportionate dwarf (midget,) however, few of its miniaturized features have survived.

The house was added to the National Register of Historic Places in 1993.

See also
 National Register of Historic Places listings in Plymouth County, Massachusetts
 Middleborough Historical Museum, which exhibits an extensive collection of Tom Thumb's clothing and personal items from the house

References

Middleborough, Massachusetts
Houses in Plymouth County, Massachusetts
National Register of Historic Places in Plymouth County, Massachusetts
Houses on the National Register of Historic Places in Plymouth County, Massachusetts
Second Empire architecture in Massachusetts